Han Xinyun and Christina McHale were the defending champions, but chose not to participate this year. 

Raluca Olaru and Olga Savchuk won the title, defeating Gabriela Dabrowski and Yang Zhaoxuan in the final, 0–6, 6–4, [10–5].

Seeds

Draw

References
 Draw

Hobart International
2017 Hobart International